The 1952 Florida gubernatorial election was held on November 4, 1952. Democratic nominee Daniel T. McCarty defeated Republican nominee Harry S. Swan with 74.83% of the vote.

Primary elections
Primary elections were held on May 6, 1952.

Democratic primary

Candidates
Daniel T. McCarty, former State Representative
J. Brailey Odham, former State Representative
Alto L. Adams, former Chief Justice of the Supreme Court of Florida
Bill Hendrix
Dale E. Spencer

Results

Republican primary

Candidates
Harry S. Swan, attorney
Bert L. Acker, former actor, public relations director, unsuccessful candidate for Governor in 1944 and 1948.
Elmore F. Kitzmiller, dentist

Results

General election

Candidates
Daniel T. McCarty, Democratic
Harry S. Swan, Republican

Results

References

1952
Florida
Gubernatorial